The 2009 Perak suspension bridge collapse took place on 26 October 2009. About 22 schoolchildren were feared drowned after plunging into the Kampar River when a suspension bridge they were crossing collapsed on Monday night in Kuala Dipang near Kampar, Perak. Three people died and 19 people were safe. The Kampar River is known for extreme water sports. The part of the river where the bridge collapsed is about 30 metres wide and 1.5 metres deep.

See also
2010 Penang dragon boat tragedy

History of Perak
Road incidents in Malaysia 
Perak Suspension Bridge Collapse, 2009
October 2009 events in Asia
2009 road incidents
Bridge disasters in Asia
2009 disasters in Malaysia